The Chinatown House is an historic building in Rancho Cucamonga, California.  It is one of the last surviving examples of historic Chinese worker housing in the region.

Built in 1919, the two-story brick building once housed 50 Chinese American laborers. It also served as a general store for the community.

History
The Chinese American population of the region first blossomed in the 1880s. A fire destroyed much of the community in 1919. The Chinatown House was built shortly after the fire.

Structure
The Chinatown House was built of unreinforced brick masonry, with 10 small rooms downstairs and two long rooms upstairs.

Preservation
Chinatown House was registered as a California Historical Resource with the California Office of Historic Preservation on December 22, 1975. The building was designated a city landmark in 1985, and in 2013, The National Trust for Historic Preservation added the building to its list of America's 11 Most Endangered Historic Places. Chinatown House is registered with the California Points of Historical Interest as point SBR-077.

The Cucamonga Valley Water District owns the house and had planned the house's demolition when local advocates began an effort to preserve the structure, led by a group named the Chinatown House Preservation Coalition.

References

External links
 
 ftp://gis.sanbag.ca.gov/SANBAG/Projects/Arrive/Relevant%20Studies/Rancho/General%20Plan/Chapter_2_Land_Use_Community_Design_Historic_Resources.pdf

1900s architecture in the United States
1910s architecture in the United States
1919 establishments in California
Chinese-American culture in California
Houses completed in 1919
National Register of Historic Places in San Bernardino County, California
Rancho Cucamonga, California